The Trouble with Angels may refer to:
The Trouble with Angels (Filter album), 2010
The Trouble with Angels (film), a 1966 comedy film
The Trouble with Angels (Juice Newton album), 1998
"The Trouble with Angels", a 2000 song by Kathy Mattea